Oliver! is a coming-of-age stage musical, with book, music and lyrics by Lionel Bart. The musical is based upon the 1838 novel Oliver Twist by Charles Dickens.

It premiered at the Wimbledon Theatre, southwest London in 1960 before opening in the West End, where it enjoyed a record-breaking long run. Oliver! ran on Broadway, after being brought to the U.S. by producer David Merrick in 1963. Major London revivals played from 1977–1980, 1994–1998, 2008–2011 and on tour in the UK from 2011–2013. Additionally, its 1968 film adaptation, directed by Carol Reed, won six Academy Awards including Best Picture.

Oliver! received thousands of performances in British schools, becoming one of the most popular school musicals. In 1963 Lionel Bart received the Tony Award for Best Original Score. Many songs are well known to the public, such as "Food, Glorious Food", "Consider Yourself" and "I'd Do Anything".

Background
Oliver! was the first musical adaptation of a famous Charles Dickens work to become a stage hit. There had been two previous Dickens musicals in the 1950s, both of them television adaptations of A Christmas Carol. The plot of Dickens's original novel is considerably simplified for the purposes of the musical, with Fagin being represented more as a comic character than as a villain, and large portions of the latter part of the story being completely left out. Although Dickens's novel has been called antisemitic in its portrayal of the Jew Fagin as evil, the production by Bart (himself a Jew) was more sympathetic and featured many Jewish actors in leading roles: Ron Moody (Ronald Moodnick), Georgia Brown (Lilian Klot), and Martin Horsey.

Synopsis

Act I

The musical opens in the workhouse, as the half-starved orphan boys are entering the enormous dining room for dinner. They are fed only gruel, but find some solace by imagining a richer menu ("Food Glorious Food"). Oliver gathers up the courage to ask for more. He is immediately apprehended and is told to gather his belongings by Mr. Bumble and the Widow Corney, the heartless and greedy caretakers of the workhouse ("Oliver!"). Mr. Bumble and Widow Corney are left alone, and Mr. Bumble begins to make amorous advances. Mrs. Corney pretends to resent his attentions, but ends up on Mr. Bumble's lap, as he eventually proposes to her ("I Shall Scream!"). Mr. Bumble then takes Oliver and sells him as an apprentice to an undertaker, Mr. Sowerberry ("Boy for Sale"). He and his wife taunt Oliver and Mr. Bumble ("That's Your Funeral"), causing Mr. Bumble to become angry and storm out. Oliver is sent to sleep in the basement with the coffins ("Where Is Love?").

The next morning Noah Claypole, another employee of Sowerberry, insults Oliver's dead mother, whereupon Oliver begins pummeling him. Mrs. Sowerberry and her daughter, Charlotte, also Noah's girlfriend, run in, and Mr. Bumble is sent for. He and the Sowerberrys lock Oliver in a coffin, but during all the commotion Oliver escapes. After a week on the run, he ends up in the city of London and meets a boy about his age known as the Artful Dodger. Dodger seems a kindly boy, and invites Oliver to join him and his friends ("Consider Yourself"). Dodger is, unknown to Oliver, a pickpocket, and he invites Oliver to come and live in Fagin's lair. Fagin is an elderly criminal, too old to thieve himself, who now teaches young boys to pick pockets. Oliver is completely unaware of any criminality, and believes that the boys make handkerchiefs rather than steal them. Oliver is introduced to Fagin and his boys, and is taught their ways ("You've Got to Pick a Pocket or Two").

The next day, Oliver meets Nancy, an older member of Fagin's gang, and the live-in wife of Fagin's terrifying associate Bill Sikes, a brutal house-burglar whose abuse she endures because she loves him. Nancy, along with her young friend Bet, a 15-year-old lass who idolizes Nancy, and the boys sing about how they don't mind a bit of danger ("It's a Fine Life"). Oliver bows deeply to Nancy and Bet, trying to be polite. All the boys laugh and mimic Oliver. Nancy singles out Dodger to demonstrate the way the rich people treat each other ("I'd Do Anything"). Nancy and Bet leave and Oliver is sent out with the other boys on his first pickpocketing job ("Be Back Soon"). Dodger, another boy named Charley Bates, and Oliver decide to stick together, and when Dodger and Charley rob Mr. Brownlow, a wealthy old man, they run off, leaving the horrified Oliver to be arrested for the crime ("The Robbery").

Act II

In the Three Cripples pub, at the request of boisterous customers, Nancy strikes up an old tavern song with the low-life ruffians, ("Oom-Pah-Pah"). Bill Sikes makes his first appearance, and disperses the crowd ("My Name"). Dodger runs in and tells Fagin about Oliver's capture and removal to the Brownlow household. Scared Oliver will betray the gang's whereabouts, Fagin and Bill decide to abduct Oliver and bring him back to the den, with Nancy's help. Nancy, who has come to care for Oliver, at first refuses to help, but Bill physically abuses her and forces her into obedience. In spite of this, Nancy still loves Bill, and believes he loves her too ("As Long as He Needs Me").

The next morning, at Mr. Brownlow's house in Bloomsbury, Mrs. Bedwin the housekeeper sings to Oliver ("Where Is Love? [Reprise]"), and Oliver wakes up. Mr. Brownlow and Dr. Grimwig decide that Oliver is well enough to go outside, so Brownlow sends Oliver to return some books to the library. Oliver sees a group of street vendors and joins them in song ("Who Will Buy?"). As the vendors leave, Nancy and Bill appear and grab Oliver. They bring him back to Fagin's den, where Nancy saves Oliver from a beating from Sikes after the boy tries to flee. Nancy remorsefully reviews their dreadful life, but Bill maintains that any living is better than none. Fagin tries to act as an intermediary ("It's A Fine Life [Reprise]"). Left alone, Fagin wonders what his life might be like if he left London and began an honest life ("Reviewing the Situation"); however, after thinking of various excuses, he elects to remain a thief.

Back at the workhouse, Mr. Bumble and the Widow Corney, now unhappily married, meet the dying pauper Old Sally and another old lady, who tell them that Oliver's mother, Agnes, left a gold locket when she died in childbirth. Old Sally stole the locket, which she gives to the Widow Corney. Mr. Bumble and Widow Corney, realizing that Oliver may have wealthy relatives, visit Mr. Brownlow, who has advertised in newspapers for news of him, hoping to profit from any reward given for information ("Oliver! [Reprise]"). Mr. Brownlow realises they are not interested in Oliver's welfare, but only money, and throws them out, but recognizes the picture inside the locket as a picture of his daughter, and realizes that Oliver is actually his grandson.

Nancy visits Mr. Brownlow, explains how she and Bill abducted Oliver, and remorsefully promises to deliver Oliver to him safely that night on London Bridge. She ponders again about Bill ("As Long as He Needs Me [Reprise]"). Suspecting that Nancy is up to something, Bill follows her as she sneaks Oliver out of Fagin's den. At London Bridge, he confronts them, knocks Oliver unconscious, and clubs Nancy to death. He then grabs Oliver and runs off. Mr. Brownlow arrives and discovers Nancy's body. A large crowd forms, among them the distraught Bet. Bullseye, Bill's terrier, turns on his master and returns to the scene of the crime and the crowd prepares to follow him to the hideout. Fagin and his boys leave their hideout in panic. Not finding Bill at the hideout, the crowd returns to the Thames Embankment. Bill appears at the top of the bridge, holding Oliver as hostage and threatening to kill him. Two policemen sneak up on him. One of them shoots Bill and the other grabs Oliver. After Oliver is reunited with Mr. Brownlow, the mob disperses offstage. Fagin appears and decides that the time has never looked better for him to straighten out his life ("Reviewing the Situation [Reprise]").

Musical numbers

Act I
 "Food, Glorious Food" – Workhouse Boys
 "Oliver!" – Mr Bumble, Widow Corney, Boys and Governors
 "I Shall Scream" – Mr Bumble and Widow Corney
 "Boy for Sale" – Mr Bumble
 "That's Your Funeral" – Mr Sowerberry, Mrs Sowerberry, and Mr Bumble
 "Where Is Love?" – Oliver
 "Consider Yourself" – The Artful Dodger, Oliver, and Chorus
 "You've Got to Pick a Pocket or Two" – Fagin and Fagin's Gang
 "It's a Fine Life" – Nancy, Bet, and Fagin's Gang
 "I'd Do Anything" – The Artful Dodger, Nancy, Oliver, Bet, Fagin, and Fagin's Gang
 "Be Back Soon" – Fagin, The Artful Dodger, Oliver and Fagin's Gang

Act II
 "Oom-Pah-Pah" – Nancy and Chorus
 "My Name" – Bill Sikes
 "As Long as He Needs Me" – Nancy
 "Where Is Love?" (Reprise) #– Mrs Bedwin
 "Who Will Buy?" – Oliver, Vendors, and Chorus
 "It's a Fine Life" (Reprise) #– Bill Sikes, Nancy, Fagin, and The Artful Dodger
 "Reviewing the Situation" – Fagin
 "Oliver!" (Reprise) – Mr Bumble and Widow Corney
 "As Long as He Needs Me" (Reprise) – Nancy
 "Reviewing the Situation" (Reprise) – Fagin
 Finale ("Food, Glorious Food", "Consider Yourself" and "I'd Do Anything") – Company
(Note: All songs with a # next to them are not on the original London recording. In addition, the Broadway recording drops "That's Your Funeral" and the Act Two reprise of "Oliver!".) The 1994 and 2009 London revival recordings include the Coffin Music, The Robbery, the reprises of "Where is Love" and "It's a Fine Life" and the London Bridge scene.

Productions

Original London production
Oliver! premiered at the Wimbledon Theatre for a preliminary engagement before opening at the New Theatre (now the Noël Coward Theatre) on 30 June 1960 and ran for 2,618 performances, a record for a musical in London at the time. Directed by Peter Coe, the choreographer was Malcolm Clare and costumes and scenery were by Sean Kenny. The original cast featured Ron Moody as Fagin, Georgia Brown as Nancy, and Barry Humphries in the supporting role of Mr. Sowerberry, the undertaker. Keith Hamshere (the original Oliver) is now a Hollywood still photographer; Martin Horsey (the original Artful Dodger) worked as an actor/director and authored the play L'Chaim. Other boys alternated in the juvenile leads, including Phil Collins, Leonard Whiting and Davy Jones as the Artful Dodger. The cast also included Tony Robinson as one of the Workhouse boys/Fagin's Gang, and John Bluthal (later famous as The Vicar of Dibleys Frank Pickle) as Fagin. Former professional boxer Danny Sewell (brother of television actor George Sewell) was the original Bill Sikes, and remained in the role (including the original Broadway and US touring productions) for almost six years. Danny Sewell's main competitor at audition for the role of Sikes was Michael Caine, who later stated he "cried for a week" after failing to secure the part. Steve Marriott, later a famous rock singer with the Small Faces and Humble Pie, played workhouse boys including The Artful Dodger, and he is featured on the original soundtrack LP. Michael Cashman played the role of Oliver during his time in the production.

Sid James turned down the part of Fagin as the timing of the production coincided with his own attempts to move away from the shady and roguish roles for which he was well known.

Original Broadway production

David Merrick brought Oliver! to the Broadway stage, where it premiered at the Imperial Theatre on January 6, 1963. It closed on November 14, 1964, after 774 performances. The cast featured child actor Bruce Prochnik in the title role alongside Georgia Brown and Barry Humphries, reprising their West End role as Nancy and Mr. Sowerberry, respectively, and Clive Revill as Fagin, replacing Ron Moody. The national tour and cast recording featured Michael Goodman as The Artful Dodger, but on Broadway the role was played by future Monkee Davy Jones, another veteran of the London production. The Broadway production was a critical success and received ten Tony Award nominations, including Best Musical, Best Actor in a Musical, Best Actress in a Musical and Best Featured Actor in a Musical. It won the awards for Best Scenic Design, Best Original Score and Best Music Direction. The Broadway production was revived shortly after the original production closed. The revival opened in 1965 and was directed by Peter Coe. It ran at the Martin Beck Theatre for 64 performances, featuring Victor Stiles as Oliver, Robin Ramsay as Fagin, Maura K. Wedge as Nancy, Joey Baio as The Artful Dodger, Dominic Chianese as Mr. Sowerberry, Alan Crofoot as Mr. Bumble, Danny Sewell as Bill Sikes, Bram Nossen as Mr. Brownlow, and Dodi Protero as Mrs. Bedwin.

Georgia Brown, Davy Jones, Ronnie Kroll, Joan Lombardo, and Robin Ramsay appeared performing two musical numbers from Oliver! ("I'd Do Anything" and the Act II reprise of "As Long as He Needs Me") on The Ed Sullivan Show on the evening of February 9, 1964, the same evening that the Beatles made their first U.S. television appearance on that show.Masterworks Broadway

1977 London revival
Cameron Mackintosh revived Oliver! in London for the first time in 1977. It played at the Albery Theatre (the renamed New Theatre; now the Noël Coward Theatre), starring Roy Hudd as Fagin (later replaced by Roy Dotrice and then George Layton), and ran for over two years. This production was totally faithful to the 1960 original version, using Sean Kenny's set. The original production's sepia background painted on the rear stage wall was still extant.

1983 London and Broadway revivals
Mackintosh was asked to revive the show yet again in 1983 for a limited five-week Christmas season at the Aldwych Theatre, directed by Peter Coe. Ron Moody returned as Fagin, with Jackie Marks as Nancy, Linal Haft as Bill Sikes, Meg Johnson as Mrs Corney, Peter Bayliss as Mr. Bumble, and Geoffrey Toone as Mr Brownlow. Oliver was played by Anthony Pearson and the Artful Dodger by David Garlick. The original Sean Kenny sets were used. The last professional production to use Sean Kenny's original stage design was at the Queen's Theatre, Hornchurch, Essex, in 1986. This production starred Victor Spinetti as Fagin.

The 1983 London revival of Oliver! transferred to Broadway in 1984. It opened at The Mark Hellinger Theatre and ran from April 29, 1984 through May 13, 1984, for 17 performances and 13 previews. Ron Moody reprised the role of Fagin and Patti LuPone played Nancy. David Garlick reprised his West End performance as The Artful Dodger, the first British youngster to appear on Broadway since Davy Jones, creating the Equity Exchange Program in the process. The original creative staff were used for this production, including director Peter Coe. For this production, the song "I Shall Scream" was eliminated.

LuPone, in her memoirs, said that the production should have run longer, noting that this production utilized the original sets, costumes, blocking (staging), and direction, and commented: "Hmm...maybe 'that' was the problem". Moody was nominated for a Tony Award despite the short run. The show only received one negative review; it was from Frank Rich of The New York Times who called the production "likely to hold the attention of only the youngest and most obedient children" and "just dull." It prompted one of the main backers to pull out. The positive reviews were quoted in the ad for the show, including a Clive Barnes quote: "Oliver! is glorious food for Broadway".

LuPone had asked the show's Musical Director to change her keys because they were too low for her, but was told she could not. She wrote that she "had major battles with the musical director", one concerning the term "vamp"; "he never waited for me to finish my dialogue."

1994 London revival
Cameron Mackintosh produced another revival of the show which opened at the London Palladium in the West End on 8 December 1994. The production team included a young Sam Mendes as director, with Anthony Ward as designer, Matthew Bourne as choreographer, Martin Koch as music supervisor and William David Brohn as orchestrator. The cast included Jonathan Pryce (after much persuasion) as Fagin, Sally Dexter as Nancy, Miles Anderson as Bill Sikes, James Villiers as Mr. Brownlow, James Saxon as Mr. Bumble, Jenny Galloway as Widow Corney, David Delve as Mr. Sowerberry and Julia Deakin as Mrs. Sowerberry. The role of Oliver was played by numerous child actors during the run of four years, including Gregory Bradley, Ben Reynolds, Jon Lee, Steven Webb, James Bourne,  James Rowntree and Tom Fletcher, while the Artful Dodger was played by Adam Searles and others including Matt Johnson, Paul Bailey and Bronson Webb. The role of Bet was played by Danielle McCormack, Rosalind James, Francesca Jackson and Lindsey Fawcett. The musical closed on 21 February 1998. The role of Fagin was later played by many notable British actors and comedians including George Layton, Russ Abbot, Jim Dale and Robert Lindsay (who won an Olivier Award for his performance in 1997). Bill Sikes was later portrayed by Steven Hartley and Joe McGann, and Nancy by Sonia Swaby, Claire Moore and Ruthie Henshall.

2009 London revival

A production heavily based upon the 1994 Palladium production opened in London's West End on 14 January 2009. Produced once again by Cameron Mackintosh, this revival was directed by Shakespeare expert Rupert Goold and choreographed/co-directed by Matthew Bourne. Anthony Ward repeated his acclaimed scenic and costume designs while William David Brohn joined the team as orchestrator, revising some of the musical arrangements. Designer Anthony Ward created a new cobblestone effect for the entire stage while the orchestrations were expanded with new dance arrangements given to "Consider Yourself" and "Who Will Buy?" as well as new curtain call/exit music. The prologue from the Palladium production was removed, and the show now opens as it originally did in 1960, with the workhouse children entering, singing "Food, Glorious Food".

British comedian Rowan Atkinson played Fagin. He had played the role in a school production but had turned it down in the Palladium revival. Burn Gorman played Bill Sikes, making his West End musical debut. Three actors shared the role of Oliver: Harry Stott, Laurence Jeffcoate and Gwion Wyn Jones. Robert Madge, Ross McCormack, Eric Dibb Fuller and Jack Glister played The Artful Dodger. Jodie Prenger won the role of Nancy, shared with Australian Tamsin Carroll, who played two performances each week. Sarah Lark, a runner-up on "I'd do Anything" understudied the role. Royal Shakespeare Company actor Julian Glover played Mr. Brownlow with Julian Bleach as Mr. Sowerberry/Dr. Grimwig, Louise Gold as Mrs. Sowerberry, Julius D'Silva as Mr. Bumble and Wendy Ferguson as Widow Corney. The revival was nominated for three 2010 Olivier Awards: Best Revival of a Musical, Best Actor in a Musical (Atkinson) and Best Theatre Choreography, but failed to win any. After the departure of the original Olivers, the role was passed on to Zac Hurst, Francesco Piancentini-Smith, Edward Cooke, Edward Holtom and Ethan Smith. Edward Holtom made a sad departure, one month before his scheduled leave and the date on his contract expired. No reason was given for this.

When Rowan Atkinson fell ill in April 2009, Russ Abbot stepped in to play the role temporarily. Abbot had starred in the 1997 Palladium run. In July 2009, British comedian Omid Djalili replaced Atkinson as Fagin, receiving positive reviews. In December 2009, Griff Rhys Jones took over as Fagin, with Steven Hartley as Bill Sikes. Hartley had played Sikes in the 1997 Palladium production. In March 2010, Kerry Ellis took over the role of Nancy, also receiving positive reviews. At the same time, Bleach, D'Silva and Ferguson were replaced by Jason Morell, Christian Patterson and Claire Machin, respectively. In June 2010, Russ Abbot again took over as Fagin. Stephen Moore was a replacement for Mr. Brownlow. Ron Moody, the original Fagin, joined the cast at the end of the performance on 14 June 2010, in celebration of the show's 50th Anniversary. Griff Rhys Jones returned as Fagin in December 2010.

The production closed on 8 January 2011, to be replaced at the theatre by the original London production of Shrek The Musical.

2011 UK Tour
After the 2009 revival closed in January 2011, Cameron Mackintosh announced that a new production with a new set and direction by Laurence Connor would embark on a 13-month UK and Ireland tour beginning at the Wales Millennium Centre, Cardiff in December 2011 and ending February 2013 at the Bristol Hippodrome. The tour was announced to star Neil Morrissey and Brian Conley as Fagin and Samantha Barks (who came third in the BBC reality show I'd Do Anything, which was won by Jodie Prenger to be cast in the 2009 revival as Nancy) as Nancy. Morrisey played Fagin while Conley was starring in a pantomime at the Birmingham Hippodrome, and left the production during the Birmingham run in April. He returned in October at the Newcastle Theatre Royal when Conley left to appear in I'm A Celebrity...Get Me Out Of Here! and another pantomime in Birmingham.

In January 2012, Mackintosh made a surprise appearance at the curtain call of a performance to announce that Barks had been cast as Eponine in the movie adaptation of Les Misérables, causing her to leave the tour on 1 April in Birmingham, being replaced by Cat Simmons. Barks later returned for the final two weeks of the Edinburgh Playhouse run in June before returning with Morrissey. She once again left the production early to perform at the 2013 Oscars.

International productions
In 1963, Dutch musician Seth Gaaikema translated the musical into Dutch.

In 1968, Oliver was taken to Japan, by the Japanese film company Toho Productions. "Consider Yourself" was translated into Japanese. Directed by Geoffrey Ferris who had worked on the UK production. 
Australian actor Robin Ramsay played Fagin. Most of the cast were British including Ian Calvin, along with two London original Workhouse boys, Ray Millross and Terry Latham. The rest of the workhouse boys were American.

In 1983, a new production of Oliver was the first musical produced by Philadelphia's Walnut Street Theatre as part of its inaugural season as a self-producing theatre.

The Australian tour was a successful trip through Sydney, Melbourne, and Singapore from 2002 to 2004. The show, which mirrored Sam Mendes's production, was recreated by Graham Gill. John Waters played Fagin, Tamsin Carroll was Nancy, and the production also featured Stuart Wagstaff, Steve Bastoni and Madison Orr and Keegan Joyce in the title role, which was rotated between the two. The role of the Artful Dodger was shared between Mathew Waters and Tim Matthews, with Waters performing on the opening night. Waters declined the tour after the Sydney production to appear in the Hollywood movie Peter Pan.

A North American tour began in 2003, produced by Cameron Mackintosh and Networks. It ran till March 2005 and played most major theatrical venues in the U.S. and one in Canada. The show was directed by the London team which managed the Sam Mendes version in London and the Australian tour, with Graham Gill as director. The cast included Mark McCracken as Fagin, Renata Renee Wilson as Nancy, and Justin S. Pereira Oliver Twist. In October 2008 Columbia Artists Theatricals mounted a new North American National tour directed by Clayton Philips. The production toured until March 2009.

The first Estonian production of the show was presented in the early 1990s in Tartu. A revival ran in November–December 2003 with Aivar Tommingas as Fagin and Evelin Samuel as Nancy. The musical was performed also twice in Israel in 1966 and 2008 starring Shraga Fridman and Rivka Raz in the first production and Sasson Gabai and Ania Bukshtein in the second. In December 2010 a Dutch language version of the musical opened in Gent, Belgium, to be transferred at the end of the same month to Antwerp. In 2011 a Syrian production is to be performed at the Damascus Opera. In 2012 a new production was staged by Popular Productions in Dubai, UAE (First Group Theatre). It starred Philip Cox as Fagin and Lucy Hunter-James as Nancy.

Principal characters
 Oliver Twist, the main character of the story. He is a lonely orphan boy born in the workhouse who asks for more gruel.
 Fagin, a conniving career criminal, takes in homeless boys and teaches them to pick pockets for him.
 Nancy, Bill Sikes's partner. She takes a liking to Oliver and treats him and the pickpockets like her own children, but is eventually murdered for the steps she takes on Oliver's behalf.
 Bill Sikes, Nancy's brutal and abusive partner, a burglar and her eventual murderer. One of Fagin's former successful pickpockets
 Mr. Brownlow, Oliver's grandfather, a kind man of wealth and breeding.
 Mr. Bumble, the pompous beadle of the workhouse in which Oliver was born.
 The Artful Dodger, the cleverest of Fagin's pickpockets, he introduces Fagin to Oliver. He is shown to be very close with Nancy.
 Bet, Nancy's best friend. She is sometimes depicted as her sister.Charley Bates, Dodger's friend and thief who is part of Fagin's gang. In the end of the book, he decides to change his morals and stop thieving.
 Mr. and Mrs. Sowerberry, the insensitive couple who take in Oliver and use him in their funeral business.
 Widow Corney, the matron of the workhouse where Oliver was born, later marries Mr. Bumble.
 Charlotte Sowerberry, the rude and often flirtatious daughter of Mr. and Mrs. Sowerberry. She enjoys a flirtatious relationship with Noah Claypole
 Noah Claypole, The Sowerberrys' apprentice, he bullies Oliver about his mother and enjoys a flirtatious relationship with Charlotte.
 Dr. Grimwig, foppish doctor and friend of Mr. Brownlow. He assesses Oliver's condition at the beginning of Act II, deeming him fit to go outside.
 Mrs. Bedwin, house-servant to Mr. Brownlow and carer of Oliver.
 Old Sally''', nurse at Oliver's birth. Old Sally steals Agnes's (Oliver's mother's) gold locket which is the only clue to Oliver's identity. Before she dies, she gives the locket to Mr. Bumble and Mrs. Corney.

Film adaptations

In 1968, the show was adapted for film, with a screenplay by Vernon Harris and direction by Carol Reed. It starred original Fagin Ron Moody with Jack Wild, Shani Wallis, Oliver Reed, Mark Lester, Harry Secombe and Leonard Rossiter. The 1968 motion picture won six Academy Awards including Best Picture, and received nominations for both Moody and Wild. It was first telecast in the United States by ABC-TV in 1975. The film went to cable in the US in 1982, and it is still regularly broadcast.

On March 1, 2013, a planned remake of Oliver! was announced. It was originally aiming for a 2016 release. Cameron Mackintosh, the producer of the film version of the musical Les Misérables was announced as producer, and potential talent included Les Misérables Samantha Barks, who played Nancy on the 2011-2013 UK Tour, repeating her part and Stephen Daldry as the director.

Recordings
The score of Oliver! has been recorded numerous times. There are cast recordings (on compact disc) available for the original 1960 and 1963 productions as well as the 1968 film and the 1994 and 2009 London revivals. The 2009 London cast album was recorded live on opening night.

There are several studio cast recordings of the show including one with Stanley Holloway and Alma Cogan and another with Josephine Barstow and Julian Forsyth. A new version with Julian Forsyth was issued recently, and Sally Ann Triplett replacing Barstow.

Stage casts
The following table gives the principal casting information for the major productions (both original and revival) of Oliver!.Note' Gwion Wyn Jones went on to perform on the Oliver! UK tour in Cardiff and Manchester, until he grew out of the role in February 2012.

Awards and nominations

Original Broadway production

1984 Broadway revival

1994 London revival

2009 London revival

2009 Teatr Rozrywki w ChorzowieOliver! was one of eight UK musicals featured on Royal Mail stamps, issued in February 2011.

SequelDodger!, a sequel to Lionel Bart's Oliver! was composed by Andrew Fletcher with the book and lyrics written by David Lambert. It is set seven years after the events in the novel Oliver Twist by Charles Dickens where the Artful Dodger has been sentenced to an Australian penal colony and has a romantic involvement with the character Bet.

Ownership
When Lionel Bart faced severe financial difficulties several years later, he sold his past and future rights to Oliver! to the entertainer Max Bygraves for £350. Bygraves later sold them on for £250,000.

 See also 

 August RushReferences and notes

External links

Oliver! at Theatricalia
Official website (archived)
Oliver! at the Guide to Musical Theatre

Oliver! review in The Guardian'', June 1960
Oliver! Study Guide at National Arts Centre (archived)
Oliver! at the 2009 Edinburgh Festival Fringe (archived)

1960 musicals
Broadway musicals
Musicals based on novels
Musicals based on works by Charles Dickens
Plays set in London
Plays set in the 19th century
West End musicals
Works based on Oliver Twist
British musicals
Tony Award-winning musicals
Musicals set in London